Tom Kiesche (born October 2, 1967) is an American film, television and stage actor, and novelist. In the AMC series Breaking Bad, he played the role of Clovis in seasons 2 and 3.

Television 
Kiesche has had recurring roles in Monk, Breaking Bad and Lights Out. His television guest appearances include Law & Order, Diagnosis Murder, 3rd Rock from the Sun, Angel, ER, Buffy the Vampire Slayer, Alias, JAG, The Guardian, Judging Amy, That '70s Show, CSI: Crime Scene Investigation, The Drew Carey Show, Las Vegas, Bones, Big Love, Weeds, NCIS, Without a Trace, CSI: Miami, Criminal Minds, Chuck, NCIS: Los Angeles, The Mentalist and Masters of Sex.

Television credits

Film 

His film roles include the role of Logan in Alien Raiders, Captain Hank Garrison in W.M.D. and Zimmer in Resilience.

Film credits

Youtube show credits

Novelist 
Kiesche's published works include Park Ranger Park, Sympathy for the Devil and Weakday Drifter & Other Writings.

References

External links 
 

1967 births
Living people
Male actors from New Jersey
American male television actors
American male film actors
Actors from Hackensack, New Jersey
Novelists from New Jersey